Destruction is an EP by the German thrash metal band Destruction, released on February 26, 1994.

It was the first release self-financed by Mike Sifringer on the Brain Butcher label after vocalist Marcel "Schmier" Schirmer's departure. The period of Brain Butcher releases is often called "Neo-Destruction". This album is the first of the three "Neo-Destruction" releases.

Track listing

Personnel 
Thomas Rosenmerkel – vocals
Michael Piranio – lead guitar
Mike Sifringer – rhythm guitar
Christian Englern – bass
Olly Kaiser – drums

1994 EPs
Destruction (band) albums